Deer day is an unofficial holiday held on the first day of the hunting season in many rural areas of the United States in which school districts are often closed.

From 1963 to 2019, the first day of the deer hunting season with firearms in Pennsylvania has been the Monday after Thanksgiving, which has developed into a tradition. In April 2019, the Pennsylvania Board of Game Commissioners moved the opening day of firearms deer season to the Saturday after Thanksgiving, upsetting many hunters. 

Maine holds "Youth Deer Day" in which hunters "who hold a valid junior hunting license have their own days for deer, bear, turkey and waterfowl" before the start of full deer hunting season.

References

Hunting in the United States
Unofficial observances